2gether is an album by cornetist and fluegelhornist Warren Vaché and pianist Bill Charlap released on the German Nagel-Heyer label in 2001.

Reception 

The Penguin Guide to Jazz identified the album as part of their suggested "Core Collection" of essential jazz albums and awarded the compilation a "Crown" signifying a recording that the authors "feel a special admiration or affection for". The AllMusic review by Ken Dryden stated "This very entertaining date will stand up very well to repeated listening".

On All About Jazz, C. Michael Bailey called it:

In JazzTimes, Doug Ramsey observed:

Track listing 
 "If I Should Lose You" (Ralph Rainger, Leo Robin) - 4:53
 "You and the Night and the Music" (Arthur Schwartz, Howard Dietz) - 3:50   
 "Darn That Dream" (Jimmy Van Heusen, Eddie DeLange) - 5:50   
 "What'll I Do?" (Irving Berlin) - 3:35
 "Easy Living" (Rainger, Robin) - 4:15
 "Nip-Hoc Waltz (Homage to Chopin)" (Bill Charlap) - 4:55   
 "Etude #2" (Charlap) - 3:15   
 "Soon" (George Gershwin, Ira Gershwin) - 4:31
 "Dancing on the Ceiling" (Richard Rodgers, Lorenz Hart) - 4:51   
 "Prelude to a Kiss" (Duke Ellington, Irving Gordon, Irving Mills) - 7:48
 "St. Louis Blues" (W. C. Handy) - 4:49

Personnel 
 Warren Vaché - cornet, flugelhorn
 Bill Charlap - piano

References 

2001 albums
Warren Vaché Jr. albums
Bill Charlap albums
Collaborative albums